Following is a list of senators of Paris, people who have represented the department of Paris in the Senate of France.
The department was created from the central part of the Seine department in 1968.

1968–1977 

Senators for Paris between 1968 and 1977:

1977 – 1986 

Senators for Paris between 1977 and 1986:

1986–1995 

Senators for Paris between 1986 and 1995:

1995 – 2004 

Senators for Paris between 1995 and 2004:

2004–2011 

Senators for Paris between 2004 and 2011:

2011–2017 

Senators for Paris between 2011 and 2017:

From 2017

Senators for Paris from 2017:

References

Sources

 
Lists of members of the Senate (France) by department
senators